Naif Hazazi (born 30 September 1992) is a Saudi Arabian football player who currently plays as a midfielder for Al-Raed.

Career statistics

International
Statistics accurate as of match played 10 August 2019.

Honours
Al-Qadsiah
MS League/First Division: 2014–15, runner-up 2019–20

References

External links
 

Living people
1992 births
People from Khobar
Association football midfielders
Saudi Arabian footballers
Saudi Arabia international footballers
Al-Qadsiah FC players
Al-Raed FC players
Saudi First Division League players
Saudi Professional League players